994 Otthild (prov. designation:  or 1923 NL) is a stony background asteroid from the central regions of the asteroid belt, approximately  in diameter. It was discovered on 18 March 1923, by astronomer Karl Reinmuth at the Heidelberg-Königstuhl State Observatory. The S-type asteroid has a rotation period of 5.95 hours and is rather regular in shape. It was named after a common German female name, unrelated to the discoverer's contemporaries, and taken from the almanac Lahrer Hinkender Bote.

Orbit and classification 

Otthild is a non-family asteroid of the main belt's background population when applying the hierarchical clustering method to its proper orbital elements. It orbits the Sun in the central asteroid belt at a distance of 2.2–2.8 AU once every 4 years (1,469 days; semi-major axis of 2.53 AU). Its orbit has an eccentricity of 0.12 and an inclination of 15° with respect to the ecliptic. The body's observation arc begins on 20 March 1931 at Heidelberg just two days after its official discovery observation.

Naming 

This minor planet was named Otthild, after a female name picked from the Lahrer Hinkender Bote, published in Lahr, southern Germany. A Hinkender Bote (lit. "limping messenger") was a very popular almanac, especially in the alemannic-speaking region from the late 17th throughout the early 20th century. The calendar section contains feast days, the dates of important fairs and astronomical ephemerides. For the second of July, the calendar gives "Otto" and "Otthild" as the German analogue for the catholic and protestant feast-days (Mary's Visitation and Otto).

Reinmuth's calendar names 

As with 913 Otila, 997 Priska and 1144 Oda, Reinmuth selected names from this calendar due to his many asteroid discoveries that he had trouble thinking of proper names. These names are not related to the discoverer's contemporaries. The author of the Dictionary of Minor Planet Names learned about Reinmuth's source of inspiration from private communications with Dutch astronomer Ingrid van Houten-Groeneveld, who worked as a young astronomer at Heidelberg.

Physical characteristics 

In the Bus–Binzel SMASS classification, Otthild is a common, stony S-type asteroid.

Rotation period 

In October 2005, a rotational lightcurve of Otthild was obtained from photometric observations by European observers Reiner Stoss, Jaume Nomen, Salvador Sanchez, Raoul Behrend and Laurent Bernasconi. Lightcurve analysis gave a rotation period of  hours with a relatively low brightness amplitude of  magnitude, which is indicative of a regular shape.

Poles 

A modeled lightcurve gave a concurring sidereal period of 5.94819 hours using data from the Uppsala Asteroid Photometric Catalogue, the Palomar Transient Factory survey, and individual observers (such as above), as well as sparse-in-time photometry from the NOFS, the Catalina Sky Survey, and the La Palma surveys . The study also determined two spin axes of (183.0°, −50.0°) and (41.0°, −39.0°) in ecliptic coordinates (λ, β).

Diameter and albedo 

The Collaborative Asteroid Lightcurve Link derives an albedo of 0.2136 and a diameter of 24.36 kilometers based on an absolute magnitude of 10.36.

Notes

References

External links 
 Shape Models of (994) Otthild, DAMIT, Astronomical Institute of the Charles University, Josef Ďurech, Vojtěch Sidorin
 Asteroid (994) Otthild, 3D Asteroid Catalogue
 3D Diagram of the orbit of 994 Otthild, in-the-sky.org
 Lightcurve Database Query (LCDB), at www.minorplanet.info
 Dictionary of Minor Planet Names, Google books
 Discovery Circumstances: Numbered Minor Planets (1)-(5000) – Minor Planet Center
 
 

000994
Discoveries by Karl Wilhelm Reinmuth
Named minor planets
000994
19230318